James Keating (born 1999) is an Irish hurler who plays for Cork Championship club Kildorrery and at inter-county level with the Cork senior hurling team. He usually lines out as a full-back or centre-back.

Honours

Mitchelstown CBS
Munster Colleges Senior B Hurling Championship (1): 2017

Kildorrery
North Cork Under-21 A Hurling Championship (1): 2018

Cork
Munster Under-21 Hurling Championship (1): 2018
Munster Minor Hurling Championship (1): 2017

References

1999 births
Living people
Kildorrery hurlers
Cork inter-county hurlers